Music and Video Club or MVC was a British entertainment retailer which sold DVDs, VHS, audio cassettes, video games, and CDs of popular and specialist titles. At its peak, the company operated 82 stores in the United Kingdom, and also sold products over the internet. The company closed in January 2006, after entering into administration.

History
MVC was founded by former Our Price directors, who left after W H Smith bought the company. It was bought by Kingfisher plc in 1993, which later spun it off as part of the Woolworths chain in July 2005.

In August 2005, MVC was sold to venture capital company Argyle Partners for £5.5 million. In December 2005, however, it entered administration with Kroll. In January 2006, 41 MVC stores were bought by competitor Music Zone.

On 25 January 2007, Music Zone also went into administration. 67 former Music Zone stores were taken over by music and book retailer Fopp, including some of the former MVC stores. Fopp, however, also subsequently entered administration in June 2007, though that brand was saved after purchased by HMV, and as of 2018, still has seven stores trading.

References

External links
 , previously redirected to HMV site, and then to Amazon UK. Now directed to a Sedo holding page
 , archived version of website from Feb 06

Retail companies established in 1989
Retail companies disestablished in 2006
Defunct companies based in London
Defunct retail companies of the United Kingdom
Music retailers of the United Kingdom
Video game retailers in the United Kingdom
Companies that have entered administration in the United Kingdom